The 1892 Cornell Big Red football team was an American football team that represented Cornell University during the 1892 college football season.  The team compiled a 10–1 record and outscored all opponents by a combined total of 432 to 54. Its sole loss was by a 20–14 score against Harvard.

Schedule

References

Cornell
Cornell Big Red football seasons
Cornell Big Red football